Jerzy Popławski (1 October 1919 – 21 June 2004) DFC was a Polish fighter ace of the Polish Air Force in exile during World War II with 5 confirmed kills.

Biography
Jerzy Popławski was born in 1919. In 1938 he entered the Polish Air Force Academy in Dęblin and was commissioned on 1 September 1939. After the Soviet Invasion of Poland he was evacuated to Romania, and on 29 October 1939 arrived in Marseilles via Beirut. He went to Britain in one of the first groups of Polish airmen, on 27 January 1940. He received service no. 76751. After training Popławski was posted to the No. 302 Polish Fighter Squadron on 30 July. He was transferred to the No. 111 Squadron RAF on 10 September and on 26 to the No. 229 Squadron RAF. In November 1940 he returned to No. 302 Squadron. On 6 November he was injured in an accident landing a Hurricane. On 16 March 1941 he was assigned to the No. 308 Polish Fighter Squadron. Popławski scored his first victory on 4 September 1941 shooting down a Bf 109. On 30 April he took command of his squadron. On 1 September he was sent as instructor to No. 58 Operational Training Unit. On 17 April 1943 he was given command of the No. 315 Polish Fighter Squadron.

After the war ended Popławski emigrated to Argentina. He died in Buenos Aires.

Aerial victory credits
 Bf 109 – 4 September 1941
 Bf 109 – 16 September 1941
 Bf 109 – 21 September 1941
 Bf 109 – 27 September 1941
 Bf 109 – 13 October 1941
 Bf 109 – 8 November 1941 (damaged)
 Fw 190 – 20 April 1943 (damaged)

Awards
 Virtuti Militari, Silver Cross
 Cross of Valour (Poland), three times
 Distinguished Flying Cross (United Kingdom)

References

Further reading
 Tadeusz Jerzy Krzystek, Anna Krzystek: Polskie Siły Powietrzne w Wielkiej Brytanii w latach 1940-1947 łącznie z Pomocniczą Lotniczą Służbą Kobiet (PLSK-WAAF). Sandomierz: Stratus, 2012, s. 468. 
 Jerzy Pawlak: Absolwenci Szkoły Orląt: 1925-1939. Warszawa: Retro-Art, 2009, s. 244. 
 Piotr Sikora: Asy polskiego lotnictwa. Warszawa: Oficyna Wydawnicza Alma-Press. 2014, s. 381-383. 
 Józef Zieliński: Asy polskiego lotnictwa. Warszawa: Agencja lotnicza ALTAIR, 1994, s. 66. ISBN 83862172. 
 Józef Zieliński: Lotnicy polscy w Bitwie o Wielką Brytanię. Warszawa: Oficyna Wydawnicza MH, 2005, s. 171-172.

External links
 dywizjon 315 – zdjęcie

1919 births
2004 deaths
Polish World War II flying aces
The Few
Recipients of the Silver Cross of the Virtuti Militari
Recipients of the Distinguished Flying Cross (United Kingdom)